Ibrahim Hassan (born 25 July 1991) is an Egyptian footballer who plays as a winger for Zamalek SC in the Egyptian Premier League.

Honours
Zamalek SC

 Saudi-Egyptian Super Cup: 2018
 CAF Confederation Cup : 2018–19
Egypt Cup: 2018–19

References

1991 births
Living people
Egyptian footballers
Egypt international footballers
Egyptian Premier League players
Association football wingers
Ismaily SC players
Zamalek SC players
Pyramids FC players
Footballers from Cairo